"Catagramma" is an obsolete genus of Neotropical butterflies; the name continues to be used e.g. among butterfly collectors as a form taxon. "Catagramma" species are popularly known as 88s, in reference to a pattern on the hindwing undersides of many that looks like the number 88. They are medium-sized (around 5 cm (2 in) wingspan) forest insects.

The genus once contained over 100 species, essentially being a "wastebin taxon" for what was then already recognized of the clade that became the tribe Callicorini in 1952. The members of "Catagramma" are now divided among the related genera Callicore, Catacore, Diaethria, Paulogramma and Perisama; others (like Cyclogramma) are not often considered distinct anymore however. These genera have been found to be close relatives of Antigonis and Haematera, which like them are in the Callicorini.

Jean Baptiste Boisduval lumped this conspicuous group of Callicorini during his epic Lepidoptera reviews from the 1830s to 1850s. He ignored the generic names of previous authors, creating numerous junior subjective synonyms throughout, but was widely followed by subsequent sources. Frederick DuCane Godman and Osbert Salvin, for example, used the name Catagramma in the Biologia Centrali-Americana, establishing it for posterity.

The type species of Catagramma is Catagramma hydaspes. Described in 1836 from new material by Boisduval, it belongs to the present genus Callicore. It is probably a junior subjective synonym of C. pygas, first validly described by Jean Baptiste Godart in 1924 as Nymphalis pygas.

References
 Attal, S & Crosson du Cormier, A (1996) The Genus Perisama (Nymphalidae), Sciences Nat, Venette, 149 p - 65 figs - 12 color plates 
 Dillon, L. S. (1948) The Tribe Catagrammini (Lepidoptera: Nymphalidae). Part I. The Genus Catagramma and Allies. Reading Public Museum and Art Gallery Scientific Publications, vii + 1-113, 14 plates.

External links

Pteron In Japanese but with binomial names.
Species list

Biblidinae
Obsolete arthropod taxa